Shmuly Yanklowitz (born 1981) is an Orthodox rabbi, activist, and author. In March 2012 and March 2013, Newsweek<ref>{{Cite news|url=http://www.jpost.com/Jewish-World/Jewish-News/Wolpe-heads-Newsweeks-list-of-50-top-rabbis|title=Wolpe heads 'Newsweeks list of 50 top rabbis|newspaper=The Jerusalem Post  JPost.com|access-date=2016-10-20}}</ref> and The Daily Beast listed Yanklowitz as one of the 50 most influential rabbis in America.

 Recognition 
In 2022, Yanklowitz was recognized as one of the top faith leaders to watch by the American Center for Progress. In addition,The Forward named Yanklowitz one of the 50 most influential Jews of 2016 and also one of the most inspiring rabbis in America. In 2022, Yanklowitz was honored by The Leonard I. Beerman Foundation For Peace and Justice, alongside Dolores Huerta. In 2020, Yanklowitz was named a "Hero of Dialogue" by the international group KAICIID.

Educational and professional background
Yanklowitz was ordained as an Orthodox rabbi at Yeshivat Chovevei Torah, received a second rabbinic ordination from Rabbi Shlomo Riskin, the chief rabbi of Efrat, and a third rabbinic ordination from Rabbi Nathan Lopes Cardozo of Jerusalem. He earned a master's degree at Harvard University in Leadership and Psychology and a second master's degree in Jewish Philosophy at Yeshiva University. Yanklowitz earned a Doctorate from Columbia University in Epistemology and Moral Development and has taught seminars at UCLA Law School and Barnard College.

Yanklowitz worked in corporate and non-profit consulting and was the Director of Panim JAM in Washington D.C., training others in leadership and advocacy. While in rabbinical school, Yanklowitz served at four different Orthodox congregations. Following his ordination, Yanklowitz served as Senior Jewish Educator and Director of Jewish Life at UCLA Hillel from 2010 to 2012. Yanklowitz has served as a delegate to the World Economic Forum. From August 2012 to May 2013, Yanklowitz served as the Senior Rabbi of Kehilath Israel Synagogue in Overland Park, Kansas. In July 2013, he became Executive Director, then later President and Dean, of Valley Beit Midrash in Phoenix, Arizona . Yanklowitz expanded VBM from local to national including setting up a new hub in Denver, Colorado. 

Activism
Yanklowitz is the founder of multiple nonprofit organizations that engage in activism:

 He founded Uri L'Tzedek, an Orthodox social justice organization. In May 2009, Yanklowitz and the Uri L'Tzedek team launched the Tav HaYosher, an ethical seal for kosher restaurants which has certified hundreds of restaurants around North America. 
 He founded SHAMAYIM: Jewish Animal Welfare (previously known as The Shamayim V'Aretz Institute), an animal welfare spiritual activist center.
 He founded YATOM: The Jewish Foster & Adoption Network. 
 He founded Torat Chayim, a "progressive-minded" Orthodox rabbinic association.
 In 2012, Yanklowitz co-founded "Jews for Human Rights in Syria" and has worked closely with Syrian refugees including hosting new refugee families annually at his home for Thanksgiving.
 Yanklowitz founded and leads the Jewish social justice group Arizona Jews for Justice.

Yanklowitz has advocated for a regulated organ market, cadaveric organ donation, as well as for living kidney donation. Yanklowitz is a kidney donor.

Phoenix mayor Greg Stanton appointed Yanklowitz to be a commissioner on the Phoenix Human Relations Commission. Yanklowitz has organized the Jewish community for the abolition of the death penalty. Yanklowitz is a leading advocate for increased Jewish-Muslim dialogue. Yanklowitz's organization YATOM provides "educational programs and provides small grants" to families in the adoption/fostering process. Yanklowitz engages in outreach efforts to the homeless and  advocates for their defense from harassment. Yanklowitz and the Arizona Jews for Justice team launched a mobile cooling van, with the support of the City of Phoenix, to give relief to the homeless during extreme heat.

Yanklowitz has been an advocate for racial justice including calling for police reform, prison reform, and slave reparations. Yanklowitz marched with other civil rights leaders calling to "raise the federal minimum wage to $15 an hour." Defending racial justice, Yanklowitz has called for DC statehood. Yanklowitz advocates for environmental justice. Yanklowitz speaks out against all forms of antisemitism. Yanklowitz has encouraged Jewish institutions to invest heavily in security due to the rise of antisemitic incidents He has been an advocate for women's rights. He argued that overturning  Roe v Wade is an attack on freedom of religion.  

Asylum Seeker and Refugee Relief

Yanklowitz has advocated for refugees and asylum seekers at the Southern Border of the United States calling the need to assist asylum seekers a "spiritual revolution"; Yanklowitz is critical of the mistreatment of asylum seekers. Through Uri L'Tzedek and Arizona Jews for Justice, Yanklowitz and partners have raised awareness on the issue and have led campaigns to collect supplies for asylum seekers released by Immigration and Customs Enforcement.

During the COVID-19 pandemic, Yanklowitz launched The Mask Project, which employs immigrant mothers to make masks for populations such as the Navajo Nation and the homeless.

Yanklowitz has led initiatives to support Afghan refugees.

Documentary
A film crew followed Yanklowitz for over a year to produce a PBS documentary named The Calling, a documentary series that follows seven Muslims, Catholics, Evangelical Christians, and Jews as they train to become professional clergy. The program aired in the United States in December 2010.

Yanklowitz was featured in the 2019 documentary "A Prayer for Compassion."

 Jewish Veganism 
Yanklowitz is vegan. Under Yanklowitz's direction, the SHAMAYIM: Jewish Animal Welfare launched the Synagogue Vegan Challenge in Summer 2017.

Yanklowitz has written extensively on questions of Jewish veganism and vegetarianism.  He has argued that Jewish animal ethics can encompass both speciest frameworks and more egalitarian frameworks. Yanklowitz has opposed the shackle-and-hoist method of slaughter.

In 2017, Yanklowitz was one of the rabbis who signed a statement by Jewish Veg encouraging veganism for all Jews.

In 2022, Yanklowitz proposed ways for Jewish Vegans to wear Tefillin.

Written Works
Yanklowitz's books include the following:The Five Ounce Gift: A Medical, Philosophical, & Spiritual Jewish Guide to Kidney Donation (Ben Yehuda Press) – 2022The Book of Proverbs: A Social Justice Commentary (CCAR Press) – 2022From Suffering to Healing: Jewish Reflections on How to Repair our Broken World (Indie Publishing, LLC) - 2021Faith and Resiliency: Spiritual & Halachic Rabbinic Perspectives on the Coronavirus Pandemic Paperback (Indie Publishing, LLC) – 2021The Book of Jonah: A Social Justice Commentary (CCAR Press) - 2020The Soul of Activism: A Spirituality for Social Change (Changemaker Books) - 2019
 Jewish Veganism and Vegetarianism: Studies and New Directions (ed.) (State University of New York Press)  - 2019
 Kashrut & Jewish Food Ethics (ed.)(Academic Studies Press) - 2019
 The Jewish Spirituality of Service: Giving Back Rather Than Giving In! (Indie Publishing, LLC) - 2018
 Pirkei Avot: A Social Justice Commentary (CCAR Press) - 2018
 A Torah Giant: The Intellectual Legacy of Rabbi Dr. Irving Greenberg (ed.) (URIM Publications) - 2018
 Postmodern Jewish Ethics: Emerging Social Justice Paradigms (Indie Publishing, LLC) - 2017 
 Torah of the Street, Torah of the Heart (Indie Publishing, LLC) - 2016 
 Existing Eternally, Existing Tomorrow: Essays on Jewish Ethics & Social Justice (Indie Publishing, LLC) - 2015
 The Jewish Vegan (ed.) (Indie Publishing, LLC) - 2015
 SPARKS! Bringing Light Back into the World (Indie Publishing, LLC) - 2014 
 Soul Searching: A Jewish Workbook for Spiritual Exploration and Growth (Indie Publishing, LLC) - 2014 
 Bringing Heaven Down To Earth: Jewish Ethics for a Complex and Evolving World  (Indie Publishing, LLC) - 2014 
 Spiritual Courage: Vignettes on Jewish Leadership for the Twenty-First Century  (Indie Publishing, LLC)  - 2014
 The Soul of Jewish Social Justice (URIM Publications) - 2014
 Epistemic Development in Talmud Study - 2013 
 Jewish Ethics & Social Justice: A Guide for the 21st Century (Derusha Publishing, LLC) - 2012

Yanklowitz's writing has been described as challenging Jews to seek social justice.  Regarding Jewish Ethics & Social Justice, Peter L. Rothholz wrote that "in language that is at once passionate and direct, the author tackles a number of delicate subjects head on and makes practical suggestions for dealing with them."  Regarding Pirkei Avot: A Social Justice Commentary, David Ellenson wrote that Yanklowitz "inspires" and "challenges his readers... to improve the world." In its review of the Book of Jonah: A Social Justice Commentary'', the Jerusalem Post noted that the book was "refreshing" and "worth your investment of time and effort to understand the Book of Jonah through the lens of social justice." Yanklowitz's commentary on the Book of Proverbs received a starred review from Publishers Weekly.

Personal life
Yanklowitz is married, has four biological children, has fostered children, and lives in Scottsdale.  Yanklowitz himself underwent an Orthodox conversion to Judaism, as he is the son of a Jewish father and a Christian mother. He is an advocate for greater inclusion of Jewish converts and for the inclusion of interfaith families.

References

External links
 Official Website
 

1981 births
Living people
American Orthodox rabbis
Harvard University alumni
American chief executives
American veganism activists
Teachers College, Columbia University alumni
Yeshiva University alumni
Jewish ethicists
Jewish vegetarianism
21st-century American rabbis